Almere City Football Club is a Dutch professional football club based in Almere, Flevoland. Founded in 2001, plays in the Eerste Divisie, the second tier of Dutch football, and hosts home matches at the Yanmar Stadion.

The club builds on former clubs from Amsterdam and is a result of ambitions of the Almere city council to play an active role in top sports. To that end, the sports club Omniworld was formed, which comprises a volleyball branch, a basketball branch and a football branch. Prior to the 2010–11 season, the club was renamed to Almere City FC.

History
Almere City can trace its history back to 1976, with the merger of DWS, Volewijckers and Blauw-Wit into FC Amsterdam. Disgruntled DWS supporters founded their own club, De Zwarte Schapen, named after their nickname, which translates as "Black Sheep". The club quickly rose through the ranks of Dutch amateur football, eventually reaching the Hoofdklasse. After several violent incidents on the pitch and a six-month suspension by the Royal Dutch Football Association (KNVB), the club moved from Amsterdam to nearby Almere and changed its name to Sporting Flevoland.

That name was changed to FC Omniworld in 2001 as a result of the efforts of a consortium (in which the city of Almere was a participant) to bring professional sports to Almere. These plans included a basketball club (BC Omniworld, now defunct), a volleyball club (VC Omniworld, now defunct) and the football club (FC Omniworld). However, when the Leefbaar Almere party became the largest party in the city council in 2002, the community withdrew from the project. This caused the club to fail the criteria for admission to the professional league in 2004.

Private investors were found, and the club managed to meet the first two criteria for admission (among which is a balanced budget) in late 2004 and early 2005. After FC Omniworld's stadium (the 3,000 seater Yanmar Stadion) and pitch were approved by the KNVB as well, the club met all criteria for admission, and joined the 19 clubs already in the Eerste Divisie. The club's first official match would have been held on 12 August 2005 against BV Veendam. However, the referee postponed the match shortly before the kick-off because heavy rain had made the artificial turf pitch unplayable. The club's professional debut came a week later, in an away match against FC Eindhoven, a 2–0 defeat. FC Omniworld registered its first official goal a few days later, in a 2–3 home defeat against FC Den Bosch, as Juan Viedma Schenkhuizen scored to make the score 1–2 in the 37th minute. Omniworld's first league point was achieved a week later, on 29 August against Go Ahead Eagles (2–2). The club's first victory came on 16 September, when Fortuna Sittard were defeated 3–2. In its first season, Omniworld finished in 19th place with 29 points from 38 matches. Forward Sjoerd Ars ended in fifth place in the top goalscorer ranking, with 17 goals.

Ars was transferred to Go Ahead Eagles for the 2006–07 season, but the results for Omniworld improved. The club achieved 41 points from 38 matches, finishing the season in 16th place. The 2–7 home match defeat FC Zwolle on 16 March 2007 resulted in the then-worst defeat in the club's short history.

In March 2010, the club was renamed AFC Almere City before being changed again a few weeks later to Almere City FC, as the "AFC" prefix was deemed to be too reminiscent of the club's partners AFC Ajax. In their second match of the 2010–11 season, they were defeated 12–1 by Sparta Rotterdam, who equalled Ajax's Dutch league record win, with Johan Voskamp scoring a Jupiler League record eight goals on his debut.

In August 2019, the club announced plans of building a new grandstand and a club office building. The grandstand was completed during the 2020 winter break and has increased the capacity of the stadium from around 3,000 to 4,501 spectators.

Results

Club name
De Zwarte Schapen (1959–1978)
Argonaut-Zwarte Schapen (1978–1988)
FC De Sloterplas (1988–1992)
Sporting Flevoland (1996–2001)
FC Omniworld (2001–2010)
AFC Almere City (2010)
Almere City FC (2010–present)

Current squad

Out on loan

Notable former players
 Nordin Amrabat (2006–2007)
 Oussama Assaidi (2006–2008)
 Wamberto (2007–2008)
 Yannis Anastasiou (2007–2008)
 Soufyan Ahannach (2012–2017)
 Vincent Janssen (2013–2015)
 Pablo Rosario (2015–2016)
 Ezra Walian (2017–2019)

Club Officials

References

External links

 

 
Football clubs in Flevoland
Association football clubs established in 2001
Multi-sport clubs in the Netherlands
Football in Almere
Sports clubs in Almere
Articles which contain graphical timelines